The Temperate Northern Pacific is a biogeographic region of the Earth's seas, comprising the temperate waters of the northern Pacific Ocean.

The Temperate Northern Pacific connects, via the Bering Sea, to the Arctic marine realm, which includes the polar waters of the Arctic Sea. To the south, it transitions to the tropical marine realms of the Pacific, including the Tropical Eastern Pacific along the Pacific coast of the Americas, the Eastern Indo-Pacific in the central Pacific Ocean, and the Central Indo-Pacific of the western Pacific basin. The Taiwan Strait forms the boundary between the Temperate Northern Pacific and the Central Indo-Pacific.

Characteristic fauna include the Pacific salmon and trout (Oncorhynchus spp.), gray whale (Eschrichtius robustus), and North Pacific right whale (Eubalaena japonica).

Subdivisions
The Temperate Northern Pacific is further subdivided into marine provinces, and the marine provinces divided into marine ecoregions:

Cold Temperate Northwest Pacific

Sea of Okhotsk
Kamchatka Shelf and Coast
Oyashio Current
Northern Honshu
Sea of Japan
Yellow Sea

Warm Temperate Northwest Pacific

Central Kuroshio Current
East China Sea

Cold Temperate Northeast Pacific

Aleutian Islands
Gulf of Alaska
North American Pacific Fjordland
Puget Trough/Georgia Basin
Oregon, Washington, Vancouver Coast and Shelf
Northern California

Warm Temperate Northeast Pacific

 Southern California Bight
 Cortezian
 Magdalena Transition

References
 Spalding, Mark D., Helen E. Fox, Gerald R. Allen, Nick Davidson et al. "Marine Ecoregions of the World: A Bioregionalization of Coastal and Shelf Areas". Bioscience Vol. 57 No. 7, July/August 2007, pp. 573–583. 

Marine realms
Pacific Ocean